W. Mack Grady is an American engineer, currently the Professor of Electrical & Computer Engineering at Baylor University,  Josey Centennial Professor Emeritus in Energy Resources at Cockrell School of Engineering, University of Texas at Austin and also a fellow of the Institute of Electrical and Electronics Engineers.

References

Year of birth missing (living people)
Living people
Fellow Members of the IEEE
21st-century American engineers
University of Texas at Austin faculty
Baylor University faculty
American electrical engineers